Mount Bahr Aseman (Kuh-e Bahr Aseman) is a mountain that is located approximately 15 kilometres south of the town of Sarduiyeh and about 60 kilometres east of the city of Baft in Kerman Province. With an elevation of 3886 metres, this mountain is among high peaks of Iran. Made chiefly of Eocene pyroclastic rocks, Mount Bahr Aseman is situated in a central Iranian range, Sahand-Bazman volcanic range or belt, a mountain range which was formed mainly during Eocene volcanism and that stretches approximately from Sahand Volcano in the north-west of Iran to Bazman Volcano in the south-east of Iran.

Bibliography
 Kuh-e Bahr Aseman Map - Iran - Mapcarta. Microsoft Encarta World Atlas 2001, Microsoft Corporation. The Geological Map of Iran, National Geoscience Database of Iran, www.ngdir.ir.

Mountains of Kerman Province
Landforms of Kerman Province
Mountains of Iran